Isan is a region of Thailand.

Isan or ISAN may also refer to:

 Isan (band), a British electronic music group
 Isan (town), a town in Thailand
 Isan people, an ethno-regional group of people native to Northeastern Thailand
 Isan language, the collective name for the dialects of the Lao language as they are spoken in Thailand
 Isan, a dialect of the Yopno language of Papua New Guinea
 Institute for Spectroscopy Russian Academy of Sciences
 InStore Audio Network, a supplier of background music for supermarkets and drugstores
 International Society for Autonomic Neuroscience
 International Standard Audiovisual Number, a unique identifier for audiovisual works

People
 Saint Isan, 6th-century saint of South Wales
 Isan Díaz (born 1996), Puerto Rican baseball player
 Isan Reiyu, the Japanese name of Zen Master Guishan Lingyou (771-853)
 Isan Reynaldo Ortiz Suárez (born 1985), Cuban chess grandmaster

See also
 
 Isani (Tbilisi Metro), a metro station in Tbilisi, Georgia
 Isa (disambiguation), of which Isan may be an adjective form
 Esan (disambiguation) of Nigeria, which can refer to the region, people, and language